Henan Provincial Sports Centre Stadium (Simplified Chinese: 河南省体育场) is a multi-use stadium in Zhengzhou, China.  It is currently used mostly for football matches athletics, concerts (for Chinese singers) and meets.  The stadium holds about 48,000 people.

References

External links 
 

Football venues in China
Sports venues in Henan